The following is a notable list of Indian student organizations:

Student
Student organisations in India
Student wings of political parties in India
Student politics in India